The Deputy Assistant Secretary of the Navy for Procurement (DASN P) serves as the principal adviser to the Assistant Secretary for Research, Development and Acquisition on contracting and acquisition policy.

The DASN P serves as the Navy's Competition Advocate General, and advises the ASN on Federal Acquisition Regulation (FAR), Defense Acquisition Regulations System (DFARS) and Navy-specific acquisition regulations and policies.

The current DASN (P) is Cindy R. Shaver.

References

External links
 

Office of the Secretary of the Navy